Usherfjellet is a mountain in Bünsow Land at Spitsbergen, Svalbard. It has a height of 683 m.a.s.l., and is located at the western side of Gipsdalen, near the mountain ridges of Grahamkammen and Skeltonfjellet. Usherfjellet is named after Scotsman Thomas Leslie Usher.

See also
Usherbreen

References

Mountains of Spitsbergen